Pultz Farmhouse is a historic home located at Wurtemberg in Dutchess County, New York.  The house is a three part, one story rectangular dwelling. The central section dates to about 1750 and is a five bay, center hall plan building.  The two bay north wing was attached about 1800.  The saltbox wing was also added about 1800.  Also on the property is a contributing machine shed.

It was added to the National Register of Historic Places in 1987.

References

Houses on the National Register of Historic Places in New York (state)
Houses completed in 1750
Houses in Dutchess County, New York
National Register of Historic Places in Dutchess County, New York